A Thousand Kisses Deep is a 2011 film directed by Dana Lustig and based on a screenplay by Alex Kustanovich and Vadim Moldovan. The film, starring Dougray Scott, Jodie Whittaker and Emilia Fox, is a fantastical thriller about a young woman who, via time-travel, pieces together the events that led to her own death. The film premiered at the 2011 Raindance Film Festival in the United Kingdom and was released in June 2012 in the United Kingdom and Ireland. The film was released in the United States on DVD and digital platforms on 6 August 2013 by Osiris Entertainment.

Plot
Mia Selva (Jodie Whittaker) witnessed an old woman living upstairs commit suicide by jumping from their mansion flats. At the pavement, where the woman's body lies, Mia discovered pieces of a torn photograph of Ludwig Giroux (Dougray Scott), her ex-lover. As the photo was never given to anyone besides Mia, she decided to take a look in the old woman's flat after bribing Max (David Warner), the building's kindly caretaker. Before entering the old woman's flat, Max demanded Mia should not touch anything, while she promised she wouldn't. There, she discovered many of her personal belongings, including her family photo, her pill containers, and a letter, with a television showing the time 2046.

Mia was convinced this was a reflection of her own future. Despite Max's warning, she took out the letter. Max was upset and took Mia with the flat lift, which encompassed the ability to travel back and forwards through time. With the lift, Mia was able to revisit the most significant stages of her life, with the hope she could stop the event from happening.

Firstly, she visited her younger self, who was deeply in love with Ludwig but also abused by him. Ludwig was a married trumpeter, who performed in the pub "Harmony". He was going to leave Mia as he claimed he was going to New York City to restart his music career. Mia tried to help her younger self and her future through sabotaging the relationship by telling the truth to Stella, Ludwig's wife. After leaving the pub, she confronted her younger self. Mia tried to convince young Mia to leave Ludwig by showing the letter to her. Young Mia refused, claiming she was able to handle her own life. Returning to her flat, Mia was confronted and sexually teased by Ludwig but witnessed by her younger self. Shocked, young Mia ran away but was hit by a car.

Mia was then taken to her 18th birthday, when she started to date Ludwig. It was revealed Ludwig was actually old enough to be her father. Mia rushed to Harmony in hope of stopping her younger self but failed. Now, Mia asked Max to take her to the time when the family photo was taken. It was the day before her 10th birthday, when her parents took her to a park to listen to a clown playing a trumpet. When kid Mia demanded a "real song", Mia discovered the clown was in fact Ludwig. Mia tried to take kid Mia away from Ludwig but kid Mia wanted the clown to come to her birthday party, while Mia was invited by Doug, her father.

Mia walked with Ludwig to Harmony. After they left the pub, they were attacked by two gangsters whom Ludwig owed money to. They managed to get away and Mia gave Ludwig a bundle of money, convincing him to go to America. Ludwig took the money and left with gratitude. Next day, Mia went to the birthday party and talked to Doris, her mother, as well as encouraging kid Mia. Out of her surprise, Ludwig showed up in her flat. To worsen the situation, Ludwig was having a sexual interaction with Doris but was caught by Doug. Doug shot Ludwig in his arm and Mia took the gun with her. Mia then took kid Mia outside but was confronted by the police. She managed to flee and ran into Max. Mia asked Max to take her to the time when all things began.

Mia arrived in the time when her family moved into the flat. In this time, she met her parents, while Doris suggested they should go to Harmony for dinner. In the pub, Mia was shocked and horrified to discover the truth; Doris was having an affair with Ludwig and he was Mia's biological father. Doris was hospitalised as she was going to give birth, while Mia was vomiting outside the pub. Out of anger and despair, Mia shot Ludwig in the abdomen and fled the pub.

Mia went to the hospital to visit baby Mia. She then went back to the flat to see Max, asking about the old woman living upstairs. Max claimed he did not know such a person and passed her the box containing Doris's personal belongings in her final moment.

Back in the present day, Mia took the box to her mother's grave. Feeling relieved, Mia left the graveyard, living on her own life.

Cast

 Jodie Whittaker as Mia Selva
 Dougray Scott as Ludwig Giroux 
 Emilia Fox as Doris Selva
 David Warner as Max
 Allan Corduner as Buddy
 Jonathan Slinger as Doug Selva
 Chris Wilson as Police Officer

Production
Production was announced in December 2009 on the film, then titled The Veil of Maya. Production would begin in London in January 2010, with Dougray Scott the first cast member on board.

Director Dana Lustig was the one who asked for the film's title to be changed from The Veil of Maya to Harmony and eventually A Thousand Kisses Deep. "It was originally called The Veil of Maya, but my daughter is called Maya..... so we changed the name to Mia. But people said the title didn’t mean anything, so we changed it to Harmony, because of the music element and the idea of having harmony between yourself and your past and your future, but nobody got that either! So the producers came up with the idea of A Thousand Kisses Deep, and adding the Leonard Cohen poem at the beginning and end".

Actor Dougray Scott took up playing trumpet for the film; Guy Barker taught him.

Release
The film premiered at the Raindance Film Festival in the United Kingdom on 29 September 2011. The film was released theatrically in the United Kingdom and Ireland on 15 June 2012, and on DVD in the United Kingdom on 4 February 2013. The film premiered on DVD and digital in the United States on 6 August 2013.

References

External links
 
 
 WhatCulture - Review
 A Thousand Kisses Deep - Little White Lies Review
 SFX - Review
 Total Film - Review
 The Guardian - Review
 Battle Royale with Cheese - Review
 Moments of Film - Review
 Cinema Assassin - DVD and Release Date
 Film Arcade - DVD Announcement and Trailer
 MediaMikes.com - DVD and Digital Release Announcement
 SKNR.NET - Poster and Release News

2010s science fiction films
Incest in film
Films about time travel
2010s English-language films